Zheng Guanying or Cheng Kuan-ying (1842-1922 or 1923) was a Chinese reformist active in the late Qing Dynasty. He was a proponent of fighting economic dominance by Western countries of China through economic nationalism, of parliamentary representative democracy, and of women's rights.

History

His family members resided in Macau, but his birthplace was Xiangshan, Guangdong; today this is the Yongmo area of Sanxiang, Zhongshan. He lived in the Mandarin's House in São Lourenço, Macau.

He made a career as a comprador after moving to Shanghai at 16 years of age; he previously took and failed the xiucai imperial examinations at that age; he ultimately never passed any such examinations. He first worked for Overweg and Company, a British firm, and later for Butterfield & Swire. Initially he used his funds to buy official titles. In 1879 he became a circuit intendant or daotai as an award for his community service, and he received other titles due to his service work. He took night classes on the English language at the Anglo-Chinese School. He began his own firm after turning 41. He went back to Macau in late 1886.

His employment background differed from those of other Chinese reformers of that era; others had academic or government backgrounds.

Works
In the early 1870s he published essays about politics.

Words of Warning to a Prosperous Age (盛世危言 shèngshì wēiyán) was published in 1893.

Travels to the South, a travel log, was the result of his 1884 intelligence-gathering mission in French Indochina.

Legacy and scholarship
Zheng's writings had an extraordinary influence, both in his own time and in later decades. Among those who acknowledge his inspiration were Mao Zedong, and Lu Xun.

As of 2011 most English-language journal articles discussing Zheng were published in the 1960s, and few English-language books on him existed. Beginning in the 1980s more articles about Zheng were published in Chinese.

Escola Oficial Zheng Guanying, a government school in Macau, was given its current name in 2011. The 160th anniversary of the birth of Zheng was held in Zhongshan in 2002.

References

Sources
 Guo, Wu. Zheng Guanying, Merchant Reformer of Late Qing China and his Influence on Economics, Politics, and Society. Cambria Press. May 28, 2010. .

Further reading
English:
 Chong, Key Ray. "Cheng Kuan-ying (1841–1920): A Source of Sun Yat-sen's Nationalist Ideology?" The Journal of Asian Studies. Association for Asian Studies, Volume 28, Issue 2. February 1969, pp. 247–267. Published online 1 March 2011. .
 Hao, Yen-P'ing. "Cheng Kuan-ying: The Comprador as Reformer." The Journal of Asian Studies. Association for Asian Studies, Vol. 29, No. 1 (Nov., 1969), pp. 15–22. .

Chinese:
 Xia, Dongyuan. Zheng Guanying Ji Shang Ce. (Collected works by Zheng Guanying, Volume 1). Shanghai Renmin Chubanshe, Shanghai 1982.
 Xia, Dongyuan. Zheng Guanying Ji Xia Ce. (Collected works by Zheng Guanying, Volume 2). Shanghai Renmin Chubanshe, Shanghai 1982.
 Fung, Yiu-shing (1998). "Zheng Guanying's (1841-1923) ideas of parliamentary reform as expounded in his Shengshi Weiyan = Zheng Guanying "Sheng shi wei yan" zhong de yi yuan gai ge si xiang" (Master's thesis). University of Hong Kong. DOI 10.5353/th_b3195197. English abstract available.
 Ha, Chi-kwan (1999). "Zheng Guanying's (1842-1922) ideas of political reform = Zheng Guanying zheng zhi gai ge si xiang yan jiu" (Master's thesis). University of Hong Kong. DOI: 10.5353/th_b3195199. English abstract available.
 Kwong, Ming-wai (2007). "Daoist influence on Zheng Guanying's (1842-1922) thought = Zheng Guanying de dao jiao qing xiang yu ji shi si xiang yan jiu" (Master's thesis). University of Hong Kong. DOI 10.5353/th_b3859870. English abstract available.
 Siu, Men-yee Anita (1989). "A study of Zheng Guanying's (1842-1922) economic thought = Zheng Guanying de jing ji si xiang yan jiu" (Master's thesis). University of Hong Kong. DOI: 10.5353/th_b3194967. At the University of Hong Kong Libraries Electronic Resources Alumni e-Library. English abstract available.
 Wang, Ying-k'ang. "Cheng Kuan-ying ch'i-jen chi chʻi ssu-hsiang" ("The Profile and Ideas of Cheng Kuan-ying"). Shih-hsüeh yüeh-kan ("Monthly Historical Study"), formerly Hsin shih-hsüeh t'ung-hsün ("Thorough Investigation of New Historical Study"). Volume 1 (January, 1958), Issue 34.

German:
 Kehnen, Johannes. Cheng Kuan-Ying – Unternehmer und Reformer der späten Ch'ing-Zeit. Verlag Otto Harrassowitz, Wiesbaden 1975, .

1841 births
1923 deaths
Cantonese people
Chinese reformers
People from Zhongshan